Wael Fahim (born 1 January 1976) is an Egyptian handball player. He competed in the men's tournament at the 2004 Summer Olympics.

References

1976 births
Living people
Egyptian male handball players
Olympic handball players of Egypt
Handball players at the 2004 Summer Olympics